John Inglett-Fortescue (23 October 1758 – 25 November 1840) was a British politician and the Member of Parliament for Callington from 1801 to 1803.

See also
 List of MPs in the first United Kingdom Parliament

References

1758 births
1840 deaths
UK MPs 1801–1802
Members of the Parliament of the United Kingdom for English constituencies